Mariamne Johnes (30 June 1784 – 4 July 1811) was the only daughter of Thomas Johnes of Hafod Uchtryd in mid Wales. She was a talented botanist and a friend and regular correspondent of the English botanist Sir James Edward Smith. She suffered with health problems for much of her life and died in London aged 27.

Legacy 
Much of the well-documented romantic landscape at Hafod Uchtryd, including Mariamne's Garden, was built by Thomas Johnes in order better his daughter's health and quality of life. In recent years the Gardens and landscape at Hafod have been restored and are open to the public.

After Mariamne's death her parents commissioned Francis Chantrey to produce a marble monument which depicts Thomas Johnes and his wife Jane mourning the loss of their daughter. The monument was badly damaged during a fire at Hafod church in 1932, but the remains can still be seen in the Church.

References 

Welsh botanists
Welsh women scientists
1784 births
1811 deaths
Women botanists
19th-century Welsh people
19th-century British botanists
19th-century British women scientists